Count Gustaf Lagerbjelke  (6 October 1817 – 6 March 1895) was a Swedish politician, the last Lord Marshal and the first Speaker of Första kammaren of the Riksdag.

Biography
Gustaf Lagerbjelke was born 6 October 1817 on Skeppsholmen, Stockholm to colonel count Axel Lagerbjelke and baroness Carolina Antoinetta Cederström. After his father's death in 1832, he became count. Lagerbjelke studied at Uppsala University, where he became Juris utriusque kandidat in December 1838. Between 1844 and 1866, he served in the Riksdag of the Estates for the Lagerbjelke family. From 1867, he was a member of Första kammaren of the Riksdag and its speaker 1867–76 and 1881–91. Between 27 April 1858 and 31 December 1888, he was Governor of Södermanland County. Lagerbjelke died on 6 March 1895 in Brännkyrka parish in Stockholm.

Personal life
Lagerbjelke married countess Sofia Albertina Snoilsky, daughter of commander count Gustaf Snoilsky and Ulrika Juliana Lode, in Stockholm on 5 December 1843. After her death in 1847, he married Ebba Augusta Henriette Ribbing, daughter of rittmeister Bengt Ribbing and Augusta Christina Schmiterlöw, on 19 July 1859 on Liljeholmen in Jönköping.

References

Lord Marshals of the Riksdag of the Estates
Speakers of Första kammaren
Members of the Riksdag of the Estates
Members of the Första kammaren
County governors of Sweden
1817 births
1895 deaths
19th-century Swedish politicians